Camp Rock 2: The Final Jam is a 2010 American musical television film directed by Paul Hoen from a screenplay by Regina Hicks, Karin Gist, and Dan Berendsen. The 81st Disney Channel Original Movie (DCOM), the film is the sequel to Camp Rock (2008) and stars Demi Lovato, The Jonas Brothers, Maria Canals-Barrera, Meaghan Martin, and Alyson Stoner. In the film, Camp Star, an upstart rival summer music camp, makes Camp Rock's existence uncertain.

It was the last sequel of a Disney Channel Original Movie, until Teen Beach 2 (2015).

Plot
Mitchie Torres and her mother, Connie, return to Camp Rock for another summer. They see a new camp, Camp Star, has opened across them and Mitchie and her friends notice there are fewer campers at Camp Rock. After Opening Jam, the camp's meet-and-greet, Camp Star send snacks to Camp Rock and invite them to their upcoming bonfire event that night. Brown Cesario, Camp Rock's director, is hesitant to attend as Camp Star was founded by Axel Turner, whom Brown kicked out of his band years ago. 

Most of Camp Rock attend at Mitchie's behest and they soon realize the bonfire was to set up an expensive, elaborate performance to entice their campers and counselors to join Camp Star; while few campers join (including Tess Tyler), several counselors make the switch. With minimal staff, Brown announces the closure of camp but Mitchie and her friends persuade him to keep it open after assuming roles as counselors. Meanwhile, during the performance, Axel's daughter, Dana, has her bracelet come loose from her hand and hit Nate Gray; after returning the bracelet, they begin to bond, but Dana is dismayed at Nate's nonchalance.

Mitchie and her friends initially struggle to settle into their role as counselors. Upset at being blindsided during their visit, they revisit Camp Star, who are shown to solely prioritize practicing music, with no space for other activities. Axel suggests broadcasting a competition between the camps on television, with the winner decided by a public vote; although reluctant, Mitchie agrees at the urging of her friends. This angers Brown, and Mitchie overhears him tell Connie that if Camp Rock lose, it could result in the permanent closure of the camp.

Mitchie urges focus on winning the competition, which frustrates other campers and Shane Gray, Mitchie's boyfriend, who returned to Camp Rock to spend time with her. Dismayed at this strict performance-oriented nature of camp, Shane and the other counselors organize a water balloon fight to improve the campers' spirits; this angers Mitchie, and she and Shane argue. The next day, Mitchie finds everyone rehearsing for the competition, led by Shane, and they reconcile. Meanwhile, Nate sneaks into Camp Star to express his feelings to Dana and is caught by Axel.

As the competition, Brown finds out Axel has spent exorbitant sums to ensure voting for Camp Star is easier than voting for Camp Rock. Camp Rock perform, accompanied by a video montage of camp activities, but Camp Star win the competition. Mitchie apologizes to Shane about not spending enough time with him and they kiss. At the final Camp Rock bonfire of the summer, many members of Camp Star, including Tess and Dana, opt to join Camp Rock, impressed at the camp's culture. This ensures enough campers for another summer.

Cast
 Demi Lovato as Mitchie Torres, a young girl aspiring to be a singer, now returning for her second year at Camp Rock.
 Joe Jonas as Shane Gray, the lead singer of the band Connect 3 and Mitchie's love interest.
 Nick Jonas as Nate Gray, a member of the band Connect 3.
 Kevin Jonas as Jason Gray, a member of the band Connect 3.
 Alyson Stoner as Caitlyn Gellar, a Camp Rock attendee and Mitchie's friend.
 Anna Maria Perez de Tagle as Ella Pador, a Camp Rock attendee and Mitchie's friend.
 Jasmine Richards as Margaret "Peggy" Dupree, a Camp Rock attendee and Mitchie's friend.
 Roshon Fegan as Sander Loyer, a Camp Rock attendee.
 Jordan Francis as Barron "Barry" James, a Camp Rock attendee.
 Daniel Fathers as Brown Cesario, Camp Rock's camp director.
 Daniel Kash as Axel Turner, Camp Star's founder and Brown's ex-bandmate.
 Matthew "Mdot" Finley as Luke Williams, the lead singer of Camp Star.
 Meaghan Martin as Tess Tyler, Mitchie's nemesis from the previous film, who later turns friend.
 Chloe Bridges as Dana Turner, Axel's daughter and Nate's love interest.
 Maria Canals-Barrera as Connie Torres, Mitchie's mother.
 Arisa Cox as Georgina Farlow, the host of Hitz TV, the television network covering Camp Wars.

Production
The film was shot in Toronto, Ontario, from September 3 to October 16, 2009, filming the scenes at the French River, Kilcoo Camp, The Kingbridge Centre, and Earl Bales Park.

Soundtrack

Reception

Critical response
On Rotten Tomatoes, the film has an approval rating of 63% based on 5 reviews and an average of 6.1/10. Jennifer Armstrong from Entertainment Weekly enjoyed the film and called the performance of Demi Lovato "dependently appealing".

Ratings
The film garnered 7.9 million viewers on its premiere night, the most for a movie on cable television in 2010 and the most any cable program that week (August 30 - September 5). The movie was also simulcast on Radio Disney, similar to the first installment of the franchise, but it is unknown if the ratings included the Radio Disney audience.

Home media
The film was released on DVD and Blu-ray on September 7, 2010, in the United States and Canada and was later available worldwide. It includes the Extended Edition, the special feature Rock Along Edition, and the Combo Pack.

Video game
A video game based on the film, Disney's Camp Rock: The Final Jam, was developed and published by Disney Interactive Studios. It was released in North America on August 31, 2010, and in Europe and Australia in September.

Awards and nominations

References

External links

 Official website (archived)
 

2010s English-language films
2010 television films
2010 films
2010s teen comedy films
2010s musical comedy films
Camp Rock
Television sequel films
Disney Channel Original Movie films
American teen comedy films
American teen musical films
American musical comedy films
Musical television films
Films about competitions
Films directed by Paul Hoen
Films shot in Ontario
Films set in Maine
American sequel films
Films scored by Christopher Lennertz
2010s American films